Cyril Chauquet is a French television host born in 1976. He is the producer and host of the Television series Chasing Monsters, an adventurous fishing related show where viewers follow his adventures in search of the largest fishes in the world... Cyril’s growing interest in fishing started as a young child and soon became a boundless passion. Originally from Haute Savoie in France, it was in this mountainous region that he grew up and got his start in fishing by targeting pike from the surrounding lakes and ponds. His quest for underwater creatures continues to this day. With adventure sports such as surfing and diving as hobbies, Chauquet shows a true interest and dedication for angling. 
After achieving a Bachelor’s degree in Business Administration from Webster University, Cyril started his career as an agent for a sport-fishing tour operator, he worked as a freelance journalist for fishing magazines and even became a sport fishing guide. He then founded and ran a sport fishing lodge called “Morocco Fishing Adventures”. 

In the early 2000s, Chauquet arrived in Toronto, eventually settling in Quebec where he began working on his broadcast project.
In 2005, Cyril kickstarted his television career in the show titled Fishing Adventurer, he established himself as the television host of his own documentary series in which he embarks on extreme fishing adventures in the most remote locations around the globe. With around 100 episodes produced in several languages, the charismatic “globetrotter angler” has been chasing, catching and releasing the world’s most colossal, dangerous and bizarre underwater creatures. The show considers itself half fishing/half adventure, documenting fascinating and untold stories as he goes along. 

The arrival of season 4 in 2013 marks a turning point for the show. Cyril Chauquet decides to reduce the format to 12 episodes per season, at a rate of one season every 2 years. At the same time, the team is choosing to focus more and more on the adventure, travel and exceptional fish aspects of the show. The success of the 4th season sparked the interest of new TV channels around the world. The show was then renamed Chasing Monsters internationally. Chasing Monsters is an adventure show that uses fishing as an inspiration. Cyril is compared to the Indiana Jones of fishing. In 2015 his new show titled Chasing Monsters made its debut.

Season 1 of Chasing Monsters aired in 2016. The format remains 12 episodes per season and the show becomes increasingly adventure-oriented. This change in narrative allows Chasing Monsters to captivate a much larger audience which appeals to more than just fisher people. This change is what helped Chasing Monsters find its way to big channels such as BBC and even Netflix. In 2017 season 2 was released and then in August 2018, Season 3 of Chasing Monsters containing 12 episodes was released in Canada as well as in Asia. Season 4 of Chasing Monsters containing only 6 episodes is on course to be released by the end of the year 2020.

Cyril has an impressive track record of world record-sized catches including a 550lb giant river Stingray (Himantura chaophraya) in Thailand, a massive 200lb-plus Arapaima (Arapaima cigas), a 100lb Barramundi (Lates calcarifer) in India, a 400lb-plus Goliath Grouper (Epinephelus itajara) in Florida, a 100lb Giant Trevally (Caranx ignobilis) in the South Pacific and a 200lb-plus Wels Catfish (Silurus glanis) in Spain.

Internet website 
Untamed Productions

External links 
 
 MIPcom 2015
 
 
 
 
 
 

Living people
Canadian fishers
Year of birth missing (living people)
French emigrants to Canada
Canadian television hosts